Alexander Pavlovich Teterdinko (born 20 November 1983, Volkhov, Leningrad Oblast) is a Russian political figure and a deputy of the 8th State Duma.

After graduating from the MA program at the Saint Petersburg State University, Teterdinko started working as the Chairman of the Control and Audit Commission of the Zvyozdnoye Municipality (Moskovsky District, Saint Petersburg). In March 2011, he was appointed Advisor to the Governor of Murmansk Oblast. From 2012 to 2014, Teterdinko worked as Deputy Chairman of the St. Petersburg Electoral Commission. In 2015-2016, he was the acting head of the regional executive committee of the St. Petersburg branch of the United Russia party. In 2016, he was elected deputy of the Legislative Assembly of Saint Petersburg. Since September 2021, he has served as deputy of the 8th State Duma.

In 2021, Teterdinko became the richest deputy at the Legislative Assembly of Saint Petersburg with a registered income of 15 mln rubles.

References

1983 births
Living people
People from Volkhov
United Russia politicians
21st-century Russian politicians
Eighth convocation members of the State Duma (Russian Federation)